Heinrich-Wilhelm Ahnert (29 April 1915 – 23 August 1942) was a German Luftwaffe military aviator during World War II. As a fighter ace, he was credited with 57 aerial victories, 4 over the Western Front and 53 over the Eastern Front, in an unknown number combat missions. 

Born in Altenburg, Ahnert served as an aerial reconnaissance pilot during the Invasion of Poland and during the Battle of France. He was then trained as a fighter pilot and was posted to Jagdgeschwader 52 (JG 52—52nd Fighter Wing) in early 1941. He claimed his first aerial victory on 15 February 1941 on the Western Front. Following four further aerial victories in the west, his unit was transferred to the Eastern Front in late September 1941. He claimed his first aerial victories in this theater on 6 October during the Battle of Vyazma. Ahnert was killed in action on 23 August 1942 and posthumously awarded the Knight's Cross of the Iron Cross for 57 aerial victories.

Career
Ahnert was born on 29 April 1915 in Ziegelheim near Altenburg in Thuringia of the German Empire. He originally served as an intelligence officer and aerial reconnaissance pilot and flew missions during the Invasion of Poland and during the Battle of France. Ahnert was retrained as a fighter pilot and was posted to 3. Staffel (3rd squadron) of Jagdgeschwader 52 (JG 52–52nd Fighter Wing) in early 1941. At the time the Staffel was commanded by Oberleutnant Helmut Kühle who was replaced by Oberleutnant Helmut Bennemann on 27 April. I. Gruppe (1st group) of JG 52 to which 3. Staffel was subordinated was headed by Hauptmann Wolfgang Ewald at the time. Ahnert claimed his first aerial victory on 15 February 1941 when he shot down a Royal Air Force (RAF) Hawker Hurricane fighter near Ostend.

Until 21 February, the entire I. Gruppe was based at an airfield at Katwijk in the Netherlands where it was tasked with patrolling the Dutch coast area and German Bight, the three Staffeln were then deployed at various airfields on the Dutch, German and Danish North Sea coast. On 25 May, I. Gruppe was placed under the command of Hauptmann Karl-Heinz Leesmann.

Ahnert claimed a Bristol Blenheim bomber shot down on 9 June 1941 and another on 26 August, and two Supermarine Spitfire fighters were claimed on 12 September 1941. The Blenheim bomber shot down 9 June belonged to force of six aircraft from No. 18 Squadron on mission to look for German shipping off the coast of Ameland.

War against the Soviet Union
On 22 June 1941, German forces had launched Operation Barbarossa, the invasion of the Soviet Union. Prior to its deployment on the Eastern Front, I. Gruppe was fully equipped with the Messerschmitt Bf 109 F-2. The Gruppe reached Orsha on 27 September before heading to Ponyatovka on 2 October. There, the Gruppe was initially subordinated to the Stab (headquarters unit) of Jagdgeschwader 27 (JG 27—27th Fighter Wing) and supported German forces fighting in the Battle of Vyazma as part of Operation Typhoon, the code name of the German offensive on Moscow.

Ahnert claimed his first aerial victories on the Eastern Front on 5 October 1941 when he shot down two Polikarpov I-16 fighters northeast of Bely and later that day a Polikarpov I-153 fighter. Ahnert and his wingman Leutnant Otto Schlauch had shot down three I-16 fighters from 29 IAP (Fighter Aviation Regiment—Istrebitelny Aviatsionny Polk), one of which was piloted by Leytenant Vasily Migunov who was wounded in this combat. Here Ahnert claimed two I-18 fighters, an early German designation for the Mikoyan-Gurevich MiG-1, on 14 November, an I-16 fighter on 27 November, a DJ-6 aircraft on 30 November. On 2 December, he claimed an aerial victory over a I-61 fighter, a reference to the Mikoyan-Gurevich MiG-3. The failed assault on Moscow forced I. Gruppe to retreat to an airfield at Dugino, present-day Novodugino, on 15 December where they stayed until 31 January 1942. He filed his last claim of 1941, his 15th in total, on 24 December over an I-16 fighter. Ahnert made his first claim in 1942 on 3 January over a Tupolev SB bomber. On 20 January, he claimed two Petlyakov Pe-2 bombers followed by an I-61 fighter on 26 January.

On 1 February 1942. I Gruppe was withdrawn from combat operations and was moved to Smolensk and then further west to Orsha. From 8 to 12 February the Gruppe took a train to Jesau near Königsberg, present-day Kaliningrad in Russia, for a period of recuperation and replenishment where they received new Bf 109 F-4 aircraft. The Gruppe was ordered to Olmütz, present-day Olomouc in Czech Republic, on 11 April. On 17 May, I. Gruppe relocated to Artyomovsk, present-day Bakhmut. From Artyomovsk, JG 52 supported the German forces fighting in the Second Battle of Kharkov. Operating from Artyomovsk, Ahnert claimed his 20th aerial victory, an I-61 fighter shot down on 22 May. In May, Ahnert claimed eight further aerial victories, taking his total to 28 claims.

On 1 June, the Gruppe then moved to an airfield at Grakowo, located approximately halfway between Kharkov and Kupiansk. On 14 June, Bennemann replaced Leesmann, who was transferred, as Gruppenkommandeur (group commander) of I. Gruppe of JG 52. In consequence, command of 3. Staffel was passed on to Leutnant Karl Rüttger. Fyling from Grakowo, Ahnert claimed nine aerial victories. Two days later, German forces had launched Case Blue, the strategic summer offensive in southern Russia. Ahnert claimed a Hurricane fighter shot down on 29 June.

That day, Ahnert claimed a Curtiss P-40 Warhawk fighter shot down. The next day, Rüttger became a prisoner of war and command of 3. Staffel transferred to Oberleutnant Rudolf Miethig. On 9 July, Ahnert claimed his 50th enemy aircraft destroyed when he shot down a Mikoyan-Gurevich MiG-1 fighter. For this, he was awarded the German Cross in Gold on 27 July.

On 2 August 1942, I. Gruppe was ordered to Kerch on the Kerch Peninsula. At the time, the Gruppe was moved around as a kind of fire brigade, deployed in areas where the Soviet Air Forces was particular active. The Gruppe then moved to Oryol on 15 August. His Bf 109 G-2 (Werknummer 13508—factory number) "Yellow 9" was hit by return fire from the bomber gunners and he was killed in action. Ahnert was posthumously awarded the Knight's Cross of the Iron Cross that day.

Summary of career

Aerial victory claims
According to US historian David T. Zabecki, Ahnert was credited with 57 aerial victories. Obermaier also lists Ahnert with 57 aerial victories claimed in an unknown number combat missions. This figure includes 53 claims on the Eastern Front and four over the Western Allies. Mathews and Foreman, authors of Luftwaffe Aces — Biographies and Victory Claims, researched the German Federal Archives and found records for 57 aerial victory claims, 52 of which on the Eastern Front and five on the Western Front.

Victory claims were logged to a map-reference (PQ = Planquadrat), for example "PQ 7051". These sectors were then subdivided into 36 smaller units to give a location area 3 × 4 km in size.

Awards
 Honor Goblet of the Luftwaffe on 2 March 1942 as Oberfeldwebel and pilot
 German Cross in Gold on 27 July 1942 as Oberfeldwebel in I./Jagdgeschwader 52
 Knight's Cross of the Iron Cross on 23 August 1942 (posthumous) as Oberfeldwebel and pilot in the I./Jagdgeschwader 52

Notes

References

Citations

Bibliography

 
 
 
 
 
 
 
 
 
 
 
 
 
 
 
 
 
 

1915 births
1942 deaths
Luftwaffe pilots
German World War II flying aces
Recipients of the Gold German Cross
Recipients of the Knight's Cross of the Iron Cross
Luftwaffe personnel killed in World War II
Aviators killed by being shot down
People from Altenburg
People from Saxe-Altenburg